Neil Covone (born August 31, 1969 in Hialeah, Florida) is a retired U.S. soccer midfielder. He played five games for the United States men's national soccer team and was a member of the U.S. team at the 1990 FIFA World Cup. His twin brother, Mike Covone, also played soccer.

College
In college, he played at Wake Forest University in the Atlantic Coast Conference (ACC) from 1987 to 1990,   His highest achievement came when he was named the MVP of the 1989 ACC Tournament. He was also a third-team All-American in 1988 and 1989.

National team
Besides playing five games with the senior national team and at Wake Forest, Neil captained the U.S. team at the 1989 FIFA U-20 World Cup in Saudi Arabia. This team, coached by Bob Gansler, finished fourth at the tournament. The team was also noted for having future U.S. superstar goalkeeper Kasey Keller between the sticks.

Covone earned five caps with the U.S. national team. His first game was a 3-0 loss to Chile on June 5, 1989. He came on for Jimmy Banks.  He then played sporadically over the next year. His last game was a 4-1 win over Liechtenstein on May 30, 1990.  Gansler then selected him for the U.S. roster at the 1990 FIFA World Cup. However, he never entered a game at the cup and did not play again for the national team.

Professional career
After graduating from college, he played two seasons with the Fort Lauderdale Strikers of the American Professional Soccer League. In 1991, he played in 12 games, scoring one goal, as the Strikers went to the APSL semifinals only to fall to the San Francisco Bay Blackhawks.  In 1992, Covone saw time in only five games, scoring no goals, with the Strikers.

Post-soccer career
He is currently a Partner with the Bice Cole Law Firm, PL, in Coral Gables, Florida.

References

External links
 Hinshaw & Culbertson bio

1969 births
Living people
American soccer players
Wake Forest Demon Deacons men's soccer players
American Professional Soccer League players
Fort Lauderdale Strikers (1988–1994) players
People from Hialeah, Florida
United States men's international soccer players
1990 FIFA World Cup players
American lawyers
United States men's youth international soccer players
United States men's under-20 international soccer players
Association football midfielders